Irie is a surname. Notable people with the surname include:

Evie Irie, Australian pop singer
Jamie Irie, British reggae singer
Sweetie Irie, British reggae DJ (b.1971)
Tippa Irie, British reggae singer
Welton Irie, Jamaican reggae DJ (b.1961)

Japanese 
, Japanese ice hockey player
Mayuko Irie, actress (b.1962)
, Japanese sport wrestler
Ryosuke Irie, swimmer (b.1990)
Saaya Irie, glamour model (b.1993)
Tadashi Irie, yakuza overlord (b.1944)
Taikichi Irie, photographer (1905–1992)
Takako Irie, film actress (1911–1995)
Toru Irie, soccer player (b.1977)
Toshikazu Irie, soccer player (b.1984)
Toshio Irie, swimmer (b.1911)
Toshio Irie (bureaucrat), politician (1901-1972)
Yasuhiro Irie, animator (b.1971)
Yu Irie, film director (b.1979)
, Japanese sport wrestler

Japanese-language surnames